Deogarh is a Vidhan Sabha constituency of Debagarh district.

This constituency includes Debagarh, Tileibani block, Barkote block and Reamal block.

Elected Members

Fifteen elections held during 1967 to 2019. List of members elected from Deogarh Vidhan Sabha constituency are:

2019: (19): Subash Chandra Panigrahi (BJP)
2014: (19): Nitesh Ganga Dev (BJP)
2009: (19): Sanjeeb Kumar Pradhan (BJD)
2004: (134): Nitesh Ganga Dev (Congress)
2000: (134): Subash Chandra Panigrahi (BJP)
1995: (134): Pradipta Ganga Dev (Janata Dal)
1990: (134): Pradipta Ganga Dev (Janata Dal)
1985: (134): Rajkishore Pradhan (Congress)
1980: (134): Ashwini Kumar Behera (Congress-I)
1977: (134): Bhanugang Tribhuban Dev (Janata Party)
1974: (134): Bhanugang Tribhuban Dev (Swatantra Party)
1971: (120): Bhanugang Tribhuban Dev (Swatantra Party)
1967: (120): Bhanugang Tribhuban Dev (Swatantra Party)
1961: (58): Jayadeb Thakur (Ganatantra Parishad)
1957: (40): Jayadeb Thakur (Ganatantra Parishad), Jyotimanjari Debi (Ganatantra Parishad)

Election Results

2019
In 2019 election, Bharatiya Janata Party candidate Subash Chandra Panigrahi defeated Biju Janata Dal candidate Romancha Ranjan Biswal by a margin of 7,106 votes.

2014
In 2014 election, Bharatiya Janata Party candidate Nitesh Ganga Dev defeated Biju Janata Dal candidate Anita Pradhan by a margin of 38,739 votes.

2009
In 2009 election Biju Janata Dal candidate Sanjeeb Kumar Pradhan, defeated Indian National Congress candidate Nitesh Ganga Deb  by a margin of 10,705 votes.

Notes

References

Debagarh district
Assembly constituencies of Odisha